Robin Gaerlan Aristorenas is a Filipino former "Child Wonder" known for his role as Robin.

Born in 1964, Aristorenas is the eldest son of actor Jun Aristorenas & actress Virginia. He is also the brother of Peter Aristorenas who made their first and last movie together with their father in 1977 movie under Junar Production, Mga Anak ni Harabas.

Aristorenas now is living in the United Kingdom with his family.

Filmography
 1972 - Batman & Robin
 1972 - Central Luzon
 1972 - Tarzan and the Brown Prince
 1977 - Mga Anak ni Harabas
 1981 - Estong Balisong

References

External links
 

1964 births
Living people
Filipino male film actors